This article concerns the period 789 BC – 780 BC.

Events and trends
 783 BC—Shalmaneser IV succeeds his father Adad-nirari III as king of Assyria.
 782 BC—Founding of Erebuni (Էրեբունի) by the orders of King Argishtis I at the site of current-day Yerevan.
 782 BC—Death of Zhou xuan wang, King of the Zhou Dynasty of China.
 781 BC—Zhou you wang becomes King of the Zhou Dynasty of China.
780 BC - 560 BC—The Establishment of The Greek Colonies.

Significant people

References